Joseph "Joe" Lawhorn is a United States Army military chaplain with an Army Ranger tab since 1999. He received national attention on November 20, 2014 after he used a mandatory suicide prevention presentation for the 5th Ranger Training Battalion at University of North Georgia in Dahlonega, GA to distribute religious material advocating Christianity. Chaplain Lawhorn is also an occasional author in the 5th RTB's FRG Newsletter.

Suicide prevention controversy
Lawhorn led a mandatory suicide-prevention presentation in which he distributed a flier advocating his Christian faith; this led one of the soldiers who was at the event to contact the Military Association of Atheists & Freethinkers and ultimately resulted in a Letter of Concern from Commanding Officer Col. David G. Fivecoat on November 27, 2014 and again on December 8, 2014 condemning Chaplain Lawhorn for his actions and violation of Army policy.

Numerous religious and political leaders objected to this letter.  On December 9. 2014 Liberty Institute filed a request asking for the letters to be withdrawn, and requested that there be an official response before December 15, 2015.  On December 11, 2014 Chaplain Alliance also weighed in by requesting the letter be dropped.
December 27, 2014 the Restore Military Religious Freedom Coalition sent a letter containing representatives of 20 groups, including retired Army Lt. Gen. William G. Boykin of FRC.  By February 5, 2015 twenty-four senators and U.S. representatives sent a letter to Army Secretary John McHugh demanding answers regarding the action taken. In response, the Army acknowledged that the Letter of Concern would be destroyed and removed from Chaplain Lawhorn’s permanent military file.

References

Living people
United States Army chaplains
People from South Carolina
People from Georgia (U.S. state)
Year of birth missing (living people)